Solaris is a  yacht built in 2021 for Roman Abramovich by Lloyd Werft. Media reported the yacht, which was in Barcelona for repairs, put to sea on March 8, 2022, amid seizures of other billionaires' yachts following the 2022 Russian invasion of Ukraine and the attempted scuttling of at least one, the Lady Anastasia. She was in port at Tivat, Montenegro, March 12–14, then was determined to be in Turkish waters. Between March 21 and April 3, she was reported to have docked at Bodrum in Turkey, where the ship would not be subject to international sanctions. She was moved to another Turkish port around May 5.

See also
List of motor yachts by length

References

Further reading

External links
Solaris at Boat International superyacht directory

Motor yachts
2021 ships
Roman Abramovich